Yoo Changhyuk (born April 25, 1966) is a professional Go player in South Korea.

Biography 
Yoo Changhyuk was one of Korea's best Go players. Growing up without a teacher, Yoo became a professional in 1984 and was promoted to 9 dan in 1996. He has won many international tournaments for Korea.

Titles & runners-up

References

External links
Official website 

1966 births
Living people
South Korean Go players